Yusoflu (also Romanized as Yūsoflū; also known as Yusupli) is a village in Minjavan-e Gharbi Rural District, Minjavan District, Khoda Afarin County, East Azerbaijan Province, Iran. At the 2006 census, its population was 40, in 8 families.  According to a more recent and, perhaps, reliable statistics the population is 26 people in 6 families.

Notable people

The second generation of immigrants from Yusoflu have achieved significant success in national level. A brief list is the following:
 Yousef Ali Abbasabad, a prolific scholar and writer
 Arsalan Fathipor, chairman of the economic commission in the Iranian Parliament
 Houssein Rezapour, a poet with the pen name "Razi" 
 Prof. Shahram Rezapour, a young internationally recognized mathematician
 Yaqoob Rezapour, ophthalmologist

References 

Populated places in Khoda Afarin County